UFC Fight Night: Błachowicz vs. Santos (also known as UFC Fight Night 145 or UFC on ESPN+ 3) was a mixed martial arts event produced by the Ultimate Fighting Championship that was held on February 23, 2019 at O2 Arena in Prague, Czech Republic.

Background
The event marked the promotion's first visit to the Czech Republic.

A light heavyweight bout between former KSW Light Heavyweight Champion Jan Błachowicz and Thiago Santos served as the event headliner.

Darko Stošić was scheduled to face Magomed Ankalaev at the event. However, Stošić pulled out of the fight on January 23 citing injury. He was replaced by promotional newcomer Klidson Abreu.

Sam Alvey was expected to face Gadzhimurad Antigulov at the event. However on January 25, it was reported that Alvey was chosen as a replacement for another bout at UFC 234 and the bout was scrapped.

Ramazan Emeev was expected to face Michel Prazeres at this event. However on February 4, it was reported that Emeev pulled out of the bout citing injury. He was replaced by promotional newcomer Ismail Naurdiev.

At the weigh-ins, Carlos Diego Ferreira and Klidson Abreu missed the required weight for their respective fights. Ferreira weighed in at 157 pounds, 1 pound over the lightweight non-title fight limit of 156. Meanwhile, Abreu weighed in at 209 pounds, 3 pounds over the light heavyweight non-title fight limit of 206. Both bouts were held at catchweight. Ferreira and Abreu were fined 20% of their purses, which went to their opponents Rustam Khabilov and Magomed Ankalaev.

Results

Bonus awards
The following fighters were awarded $50,000 bonuses:

Fight of the Night: No bonus awarded.
Performance of the Night: Thiago Santos, Stefan Struve, Michał Oleksiejczuk, and Dwight Grant

See also 

 List of UFC events
 2019 in UFC
 List of current UFC fighters

References 

UFC Fight Night
2019 in mixed martial arts
Mixed martial arts in the Czech Republic
February 2019 sports events in Europe
Sports competitions in Prague